Miklos Jon Molnar (born 10 April 1970), nicknamed "Danish Dynamite", is a Danish former professional footballer of Hungarian origin who played as a striker for a number of Danish and foreign clubs. He was the top goalscorer of the 1989 and 1997 Danish championships, and won the 2000 MLS Cup with American team Kansas City Wizards. He scored two goals in 18 caps for the Denmark national football team, and represented his country at the 1998 World Cup and 2000 European Championship tournaments. He was also a member of the Denmark team competing at the 1992 Summer Olympics.

When he stopped his professional football career in 2000, he continued with triathlon. In 2005, he ran under three hours (2:59:20) in Copenhagen Marathon and under 10 hours (9:50) in an Ironman in Austria.

Biography
Born in Copenhagen, Molnar played football in Copenhagen clubs B 1908, Fremad Amager and Hvidovre IF. Molnar's talent was acknowledged, as he played eight games and scored four goals for the Danish under-19 youth national team from 1986 to 1988. He made his senior debut in 1987 for Hvidovre in the Danish 2nd Division, before moving to play semi-professionally for top-flight club Boldklubben Frem in 1989. Molnar got his senior level breakthrough when he became joint top goalscorer of the 1989 Danish 1st Division championship with 14 goals, as Frem finished eighth of 14 teams. He was selected for the Danish under-21 national team in June 1989. Several clubs were interested in buying Molnar, including Danish club AGF, English club Chelsea, French club Olympique Lyonnais and Standard Liège from Belgium.

In January 1990, Molnar moved abroad to play professionally for Standard Liège. In his first full season at Liège, Molnar scored 11 goals in 26 games, and he was called up to the Danish national team by national manager Richard Møller Nielsen. Molnar made his national team debut in September 1990, and he played a total three national team games until June 1991. When Liège hired new manager Arie Haan, Molnar did not feel appreciated and sought to be loaned out. He moved from Liège to Swiss club Servette FC in the summer 1991. Molnar became league top goalscorer, as he scored 18 goals in 34 games for Servette in the Swiss 1991–92 Nationalliga A championship.

Molnar was an integral part of the Danish under-21 national team from 1991 to 1992, forming a successful attacking partnership with Peter Møller. Molnar played all Denmark's games from the qualification to the semi-finals of the 1992 UEFA European Under-21 Football Championship, which qualified Denmark for the 1992 Summer Olympics in Barcelona. He was named 1991 Danish under-21 Player of the Year. Molnar played all of Denmark's three games at the 1992 Olympics final tournament, but was sent off for a physical scuffle with a defender in Denmark's final game before elimination against the Australia under-23s. He ended his under-21 career after the 1992 Olympics, having scored a total eight goals in 21 caps.

Having ended his loan at Servette, Molnar looked to find a new club in the summer 1992. Molnar was bought by French club AS Saint-Étienne for FRF 6.000.000. He did not fit into Saint-Étienne's technical short passing tactics, and did not find goalscoring success at the club.

He was released from his contract in January 1994, and moved back home to Denmark. In February 1994, he agreed to play for Lyngby BK in the top-flight Danish championship, now called the Danish Superliga. With the stated ambition of moving abroad, Molnar played half a year at Lyngby, but did not get along with Lyngby manager Michael Schäfer. He moved to German club FSV Frankfurt in September 1994. Despite scoring 12 goals in 20 games in the 1994–95 German 2nd Bundesliga season, Molnar could not keep Frankfurt from relegation into the lower Regionalliga division.

Molnar went home to Denmark, and started playing for Superliga club Herfølge BK in September 1995. When Lyngby's first-choice striker David Nielsen left the club in June 1996, Molnar moved back to his old club to fill the spot. He was the leading goal scorer in the 1996–97 Danish Superliga with 26 goals in 33 games, and was recalled to the Danish national team by new national manager Bo Johansson, after a hiatus of more than five years. After three goals in five games at the start of the 1997–98 Superliga season, Molnar was sold to Spanish club Sevilla FC in the secondary Segunda División league, where he joined fellow Danish international Thomas Rytter.

In his first year at Sevilla, Molnar scored ten goals in 27 games, and he was included in the Danish squad for the 1998 World Cup. He took part in one match at the tournament, when he most remarkably came on as a substitute in the 58th minute of the 1–1 draw with South Africa, only to be sent off eight minutes later. His second season at Sevilla was not as successful, and Molnar was dropped from the team. When visiting American international midfielder Chris Henderson in Colorado, a former teammate of his, Molnar had been fascinated by the atmosphere in the American Major League Soccer (MLS) championship. In January 2000, he moved to MLS to play for Kansas City Wizards. While at the Wizards, he was included in the Danish squad for the 2000 European Championship in June 2000. He played a single match at the tournament, before ending his national team career. He retired from football in October 2000, after scoring the game-winning goal during the 2000 MLS Cup, as the Wizards beat Chicago Fire 1–0.

On 2 October 2011, he got a comeback, playing 20 minutes for his childhood-club, B1908, in a 2nd division game.

Honours
1991 Danish under-21 Player of the Year
MLS Cup: 2000

References

External links
Danish national team profile 
 
 
 Boldklubben Frem profile 

1970 births
Living people
Association football forwards
Danish men's footballers
Danish expatriate sportspeople in Spain
Denmark international footballers
Denmark under-21 international footballers
Denmark youth international footballers
La Liga players
Hvidovre IF players
Servette FC players
AS Saint-Étienne players
FSV Frankfurt players
Sevilla FC players
Sporting Kansas City players
Lyngby Boldklub players
Herfølge Boldklub players
Boldklubben Frem players
Olympic footballers of Denmark
Footballers at the 1992 Summer Olympics
1998 FIFA World Cup players
UEFA Euro 2000 players
Danish people of Hungarian descent
Danish Superliga players
Swiss Super League players
Ligue 1 players
2. Bundesliga players
Belgian Pro League players
Major League Soccer players
Danish expatriate men's footballers
Expatriate footballers in France
Expatriate footballers in Spain
Expatriate footballers in Belgium
Expatriate footballers in Switzerland
Expatriate footballers in Germany
Expatriate soccer players in the United States
Footballers from Copenhagen